Dahlström, Dahlstrom or Dalström is a Swedish surname, Norwegian version is Dahlstrøm. It derives from the Swedish/Norwegian words dal which means valley and ström/strøm which means stream.

People with the surname include:

Alexandra Dahlström (born 1984), Swedish actress
 André Dahlström (born 1991), Swedish e-sports player
Andreas Dahlström (born 1991), Swedish ice hockey player
Annica Dahlström (born 1941), Swedish neuroscientist
Anton Dahlström (born 1990), Swedish footballer
Axel Hampus Dalström (1829–1882), Finnish architect
Carl Dahlström (born 1995), Swedish ice hockey player
Carl Magnus Dahlström (1805–1875), Finnish merchant and industrialist
Cully Dahlstrom (1912–1998), American ice hockey player
Daniel O. Dahlstrom (born 1948), American philosopher
Donald A. Dahlstrom (1920–2004), American chemical engineer
Emma Dahlström (born 1992), Swedish skier
Erik Dahlström (1894–1953), Swedish footballer
Ernst Dahlström (1846–1924), Finnish businessman and philanthropist
Fredrik Dahlström (born 1971), Swedish footballer
Gus Dahlström (1906–1989), Swedish actor
Gustaf Dalstrom (1893–1971), American artist
Harald Dahlstrøm (born 1961), Norwegian musician
John Dahlström (born 1997), Swedish ice hockey player
Kata Dalström (1858–1923), Swedish writer and political activist
Magnus Dahlström (1859–1924), Finnish businessman and philanthropist
Malin Dahlström (born 1989), Swedish pole vaulter
Nancy Dahlstrom (born 1957), American politician
Ole Eskild Dahlstrøm (born 1970), Norwegian ice hockey player
Patti Dahlstrom, American singer
Robert Dahlstrom (born ca. 1958), American business theorist
Robin Dahlstrøm (born 1988), Norwegian ice hockey player
Sebastian Dahlström (born 1996), Finnish footballer
W. Grant Dahlstrom (1922–2006), American psychologist

Swedish-language surnames
Norwegian-language surnames